The 1990–91 Yugoslav First Basketball League season was the 47th season of the Yugoslav First Basketball League, the highest professional basketball league in SFR Yugoslavia.

Regular season

Classification

Results 

Source:

Playoff 

The winning roster of POP 84:
  Zoran Sretenović
  Velimir Perasović
  Toni Kukoč
  Petar Naumoski
  Edi Vulić
  Velibor Radović
  Zoran Savić
  Aramis Naglić
  Žan Tabak
  Paško Tomić
  Teo Čizmić
  Luka Pavićević

Coach:  Željko Pavličević

Qualification in 1991-92 season European competitions

FIBA European League
 POP 84 (champions)
 Partizan (2nd)
 Cibona (3rd)

FIBA European Cup
 Smelt Olimpija (playoffs)

FIBA Korać Cup
 Zadar (4th)
 Vojvodina (playoffs)
 Bosna (playoffs)

All-Star Game
The season saw the first ever Yugoslav Basketball League All-Star Game take place in Sarajevo's Skenderija Hall on Tuesday, 7 May 1991 after the league playoffs ended. The event was not organized by the Yugoslav Basketball Federation (KSJ), but rather as an exhibition showcase put together by the host club KK Bosna and Sarajevo-based Večernje novine daily newspaper.

Due to not being sanctioned by the KSJ and FIBA, the organizers decided to time the game in accordance with the NBA rules: four quarters of twelve minutes each rather than the then FIBA customary two halves of twenty minutes each. Divided among the arbitrarily created Red team coached by Duško Vujošević and the White team coached by Željko Pavličević, the 1990-91 Yugoslav League twenty-four best players contested a game that ended 125-114 for the White team.

The Reds (Crveni) consisted of: 4. Željko Obradović, 5. Zdravko Radulović, 6. Velimir Perasović, 7. Jure Zdovc, 8. Radisav Ćurčić, 9. Danko Cvjetićanin, 10. Mario Primorac, 11. , 12. Andro Knego, 13. Zoran Savić, 14. Žarko Paspalj, and Ivica Marić.

The Whites (Bijeli) consisted of: 4. Aleksandar Đorđević, 5. Predrag Danilović, 6. Zoran Sretenović, 7. Toni Kukoč, 8. Zoran Čutura, 9. , 10. Zoran Jovanović, 11. Miroslav Pecarski, 12. , 13. Arijan Komazec, Žan Tabak, and 15. Ivo Nakić.

In addition to the All-Star game, a three-point shootout competition and a dunk contest were held during the game's halftime.

3-point shootout
Total of 19 players signed up for the shootout that consisted of 25 shots from five different positions in 60 seconds — five racks of five balls each — with each regular ball made worth one point and the last ball in each rack (moneyball) worth two points. In the preliminary qualification, the best five were chosen for the final that took place during the All-Star Game halftime. 

The 3-point shootout finalists were:
Danko Cvjetićanin
Velimir Perasović
Arijan Komazec
Miroljub Mitrović
Željko Obradović

The final's first elimination stage was played in two rounds with each player's best score taken for classification. The two best scores posted were Komazec's and Cvjetićanin's — Komazec had 25 points in his second round while Cvjetićanin had 20 points in his first. 

The two thus went head-to-head for the title in an additional two rounds. In the first additional round, Cvjetićanin had 19 points while Komazec had 14. In the second additional round, Cvjetićanin posted 23 points while Komazec also had 23.

Komazec won due to the better first additional round. In addition to the trophy, he received a money prize of YUD30,000.

Dunk contest
Four players made the final: 
Toni Kukoč
Miroslav Pecarski
Samir Avdić
Zoran Bacalja, 18-year-old KK Zadar junior player

Five judges for the dunk competition were: Žarko Varajić, Mirza Delibašić, and Vinko Jelovac.

In the first round, Avdić's dunk earned 41 points, Kukoč's 48, Bacalja's 44, and Pecarski's 43. In the second round, Avdić had 46 points, Kukoč 46, Bacalja 50 (behind the back dunk on the second try), and Pecarski 45. In the third round, Avdić had 46 points, Kukoč 50 (one-handed dunk from the free-throw line), Bacalja 50 (behind the back dunk after a bounce), and Pecarski 46.

Kukoč and Bacalja made the two-man final. In the first round, Kukoč had 47 while Bacalja also had 47. In the second round, Kukoč had 50 (dunked with two balls) while Bacalja had 48. In the third round, Kukoč had 50 (another one-handed dunk from the free-throw line) while Bacalja had 47.

References

Yugoslav First Basketball League seasons
Yugo
Yugo